Thunder Airlines is a Canadian scheduled flight, charter and medevac airline based in Thunder Bay, Ontario. It offers an on-demand charter service from bases in Thunder Bay and Timmins. The company was founded in 1994 and operates fourteen aircraft and flies to six destinations regularly.

Destinations
Thunder Airlines operates scheduled services to the following destinations in Ontario:
Attawapiskat First Nation (Attawapiskat Airport)
Fort Albany First Nation (Fort Albany Airport)
Kashechewan First Nation (Kashechewan Airport)
Moosonee (Moosonee Airport)
Timmins (Timmins/Victor M. Power Airport)
Peawanuck (Peawanuck Airport)

Fleet
As of August 2019 Thunder Airlines website and Transport Canada list the following aircraft:

The Transport Canada site lists:
1 - Mitsubishi MU-2L (MU-2B-36)
1 - Mitsubishi MU-2N (MU-2B-36A)
1 - Marquise (MU-2B-60) all with cancelled certificates.

References

External links

Thunder Airlines official site

Regional airlines of Ontario
Charter airlines of Canada
Companies based in Thunder Bay
Airlines established in 1994
1994 establishments in Ontario